Glasgow, Kentucky is technically considered to be part of the Bowling Green, Kentucky DMA, which is ranked as the 182nd largest media market in the United States.

Print
Barren County Progress - weekly newspaper

Glasgow is also served by the Bowling Green Daily News, which was originally based in nearby Glasgow Junction (now Park City) during that publication’s early days of operation. That newspaper is published all seven days of the week.

Defunct newspapers
Glasgow Daily Times - published Monday through Saturday (1865-2020)

Television
 
Glasgow is served by all television stations in the Bowling Green area. Glasgow was also previously served by select television stations in Louisville and Nashville, Tennessee on local cable systems. 

The city of Glasgow proper is served by the Glasgow Electric Plant Board, while areas surrounding the city is served by the South Central Rural Telephone Cooperative. Both cable companies provide local public-access television channels serving the immediate area. 

Some other areas of the Glasgow micropolitan area, including parts of Barren and Metcalfe Counties, plus Cumberland County, are served by Mediacom.

Television stations

Current
WBKO
WKYU-TV 
WCZU-LD 
WNKY
WKGB-TV 
WDNZ-LD (coming soon, licensed in Glasgow)

Defunct 
Glasgow was previously served locally by these Trinity Broadcasting Network owned-and-operated translators:
WKUG-LP (2002-2007)
WKUT-LP (2002-2010) 
WKUW-LP (2007-2010)

Radio 
 
In addition to most radio stations in Bowling Green, Glasgow is served locally by the following stations listed below.

AM stations

Adjacent locals

FM stations

Defunct locals
800 AM - WSMJ - AC - Licensed to Cave City (1975-1991)

Adjacent locals

NOAA Weather Radio
The National Weather Service forecast office in Louisville provides automated weather information to the entire Mammoth Cave tourism area via Horse Cave-based weather band radio station WNG570, broadcast on a frequency of 162.500 MHz. Glasgow is also served on a secondary basis by Bowling Green’s weather radio station KIH45.

See also
Kentucky media
List of newspapers in Kentucky
List of radio stations in Kentucky 
List of television stations in Kentucky 
Media of cities in Kentucky: Bowling Green, Lexington, Louisville

References 
 

Glasgow, Kentucky 
Mass media in Kentucky
Kentucky-related lists
Glasgow, Kentucky